In mathematical morphology and digital image processing, a morphological gradient is the difference between the dilation and the erosion of a given image. It is an image where each pixel value (typically non-negative) indicates the contrast intensity in the close neighborhood of that pixel. It is useful for edge detection and segmentation applications.

Mathematical definition and types

Let  be a grayscale image, mapping points from a Euclidean space or discrete grid E (such as R2 or Z2) into the real line. Let  be a grayscale structuring element. Usually, b is symmetric and has short-support, e.g., 
.

Then, the morphological gradient of f is given by:

,

where  and  denote the dilation and the erosion, respectively.

An internal gradient is given by:

,

and an external gradient is given by:

.

The internal and external gradients are "thinner" than the gradient, but the gradient peaks are located on the edges, whereas the internal and external ones are located at each side of the edges. Notice that .

If , then all the three gradients have non-negative values at all pixels.

References
 Image Analysis and Mathematical Morphology by Jean Serra,  (1982)
 Image Analysis and Mathematical Morphology, Volume 2: Theoretical Advances by Jean Serra,  (1988)
 An Introduction to Morphological Image Processing by Edward R. Dougherty,  (1992)

External links 
 Morphological gradients, Centre de Morphologie Mathématique, École_des_Mines_de_Paris

Mathematical morphology
Digital geometry